3-D Body Adventure is a 1994 educational video game developed by Knowledge Adventure and published by Levande Böcker i Norden for MS-DOS, Mac OS, Microsoft Windows.

In 2014, Jordan Freeman Group, a subsidiary of ZOOM, officially released the title amongst other Knowledge Adventure titles, having secured the exclusive rights to upgrade and re-release the company's back-catalog to play on modern machines.

Some copies of the game come in hexagon-shaped packaging.

Gameplay
Players can explore the human body, answer questions in quizzes, or try to save a body from invading microbes.

Reception
Multimediokert felt the game gave them a headache. Retrojunk felt it was memorable, despite not having as many activities as other Knowledge Adventure titles. Superkids playtesters felt the game offered a more interesting journey through the human body than they'd experienced in school. ComputerLife thought the game's special effects made it a better alternative to processing the information than taking a heavy book off the shelf. Meanwhile, PC Magazine noted its "spectacular multimedia demos". Software for Teaching Science: A Critical Catalogue of Software for Science felt it would be a great way to encourage children's curiosity for anatomy.

It became one of Knowledge Adventure's flagship products, alongside their JumpStart series.

References

External links

Science educational video games
1994 video games
DOS games
Human body in popular culture
Classic Mac OS games
Medical video games
Video games about microbes
Video games developed in the United States
Windows games